Burlington Township is a civil township of Lapeer County in the U.S. state of Michigan.  The population was 1,478 at the 2010 Census.

Geography

Demographics
As of the census of 2000, there were 1,402 people, 508 households, and 381 families residing in the township. There were 546 housing units at an average density of 15.3 per square mile (5.9/km2). The racial makeup of the township was 97.36% White, 0.14% African American, 0.50% Native American, 0.29% Asian, 0.64% from other races, and 1.07% from two or more races. Hispanic or Latino of any race were 2.07% of the population.

There were 508 households, out of which 37.0% had children under the age of 18 living with them, 62.2% were married couples living together, 8.5% had a female householder with no husband present, and 25.0% were non-families. 19.9% of all households were made up of individuals, and 7.9% had someone living alone who was 65 years of age or older.  The average household size was 2.76 and the average family size was 3.19.

In the township the population was spread out, with 27.5% under the age of 18, 7.5% from 18 to 24, 32.0% from 25 to 44, 23.2% from 45 to 64, and 9.8% who were 65 years of age or older.  The median age was 36 years. For every 100 females, there were 99.7 males.  For every 100 females age 18 and over, there were 96.9 males.

The median income for a household in the township was $42,794, and the median income for a family was $49,342. Males had a median income of $34,792 versus $22,560 for females. The per capita income for the township was $17,108.  About 6.1% of families and 8.8% of the population were below the poverty line, including 10.5% of those under age 18 and 12.0% of those age 65 or over.

References

Townships in Lapeer County, Michigan
Townships in Michigan